Tissa was king of Upatissa Nuwara (modern-day Sri Lanka) from 454 BC to 437 BC. He succeeded his older brother Abhaya after his deposition. Tissa was appointed the regent by his eight younger brothers but would only be consecrated king after he had finally defeated his nephew Pandukabhaya. However, he was deposed by Pandukabhaya.

See also
 List of Sri Lankan monarchs
 Mahavamsa
 History of Sri Lanka
 Place names in Sri Lanka

External links
 History of Sri Lankan Kings
 Codrington's Short History of Ceylon

T
Year of birth unknown
5th-century BC deaths
Monarch of Tambapanni
T
T